Pawlichy  is a village in the administrative district of Gmina Księżpol, within Biłgoraj County, Lublin Voivodeship, in eastern Poland.

The village has a population of 44.

References

Villages in Biłgoraj County